Z machine may refer to:

 Z-machine, a text-based game interpreter
 Z Pulsed Power Facility, an x-ray generator at Sandia National Laboratories, informally known as the "Z machine"

See also
 Z (disambiguation)